Phoebus Apollo Aviation is a passenger, charter and cargo carrier and a flightschool based out of Johannesburg, Germiston.

Fleet

Current fleet 
The Phoebus Apollo Aviation fleet includes the following aircraft (as of October 2019):

Former fleet

References

External links
Phoebus Apollo Aviation
Phoebus Apollo Aviation Fleet
Exclusive Alliance 

Airlines of South Africa
Companies based in Germiston